Sheikh Ali is a district in Parwan province, Afghanistan, which is inhabited by ethnic Hazara. The Sheikh Ali Hazara tribe in Sheikh Ali district are Daikalan, Naiman, Qarlugh, Karam Ali and Babur. Sheikh Ali also has a small minority of Ismaili Hazara at the Bamiyan border of Shibar Pass.

See also 
 Districts of Afghanistan
 Sheikh Ali (Hazara tribe)

References 

Districts of Parwan Province
Hazarajat
Hazara people